The Burnside carbine was a breech-loading carbine that saw widespread use during the American Civil War.

Design

The carbine was designed and patented by Gov. and General Ambrose Burnside, who resigned his commission in the U.S. Army to devote himself full-time to working on the weapon. The carbine used a special brass cartridge which was also invented by Burnside. This cartridge contained a bullet and powder, but no primer. Pressing the weapon's two trigger guards opened the breech block and allowed the user to insert a cartridge. 

When the trigger was pulled, the hammer struck a separate percussion cap and caused a spark; a hole in the base of the cartridge exposed the black powder to this spark. The unique, conical cartridge sealed the joint between the barrel and the breech. Most other breech-loading weapons of the day tended to leak hot gas when fired, but Burnside's design eliminated this problem.

Service history
In 1857, the Ryon Burnside carbine won a competition at West Point against 17 other carbine designs. In spite of this, few of the carbines were immediately ordered by the government, but this changed with the outbreak of the Civil War, when over 55,000 were ordered for use by Union cavalrymen. This made it the third most popular carbine of the Civil War; only the Sharps carbine and the Spencer carbine were more widely used. They saw action in all theatres of the war. There were so many in service that many were captured and used by Confederates. A common complaint by users was that the unusually shaped cartridge sometimes became stuck in the breech after firing.

On the basis of ordnance returns and ammunition requisitions, it has been estimated that 43 Union cavalry regiments were using the Burnside carbine during the 1863-1864 period. Additionally, 7 Confederate cavalry units were at least partially armed with the weapon during this same period.

Five different models were produced. Production was discontinued towards the end of the Civil War, when the Burnside Rifle Company was given a contract to make Spencer carbines instead.

Effect of the carbine on Burnside's career
Though he was a poor military officer (and not too proud to admit it), Ambrose Burnside rose through the ranks partly because his carbine was so well known. He was pressured by President Lincoln several times to take command of the Union Army of the Potomac. He repeatedly declined, saying, "I was not competent to command such a large army as this." When he eventually did accept command, he led the Army of the Potomac to defeat at the Battle of Fredericksburg. The battle and the subsequent abortive offensive left Burnside's "officers complaining loudly to the White House and the War Department about his incompetence." He also performed poorly at the Battle of Spotsylvania Court House, and a court of inquiry blamed him for the Union failure at the Battle of the Crater, though the blame was later lifted from him.

See also
 Rifles in the American Civil War

References

 Ambrose E. Burnside - Improvement in metallic cartridge -

American Civil War rifles
Weapons of the Confederate States of America
Rifles of the United States
Carbine
Carbines
Single-shot rifles